In mathematics, more specifically general topology, the nested interval topology is an example of a topology given to the open interval (0,1), i.e. the set of all real numbers x such that . The open interval (0,1) is the set of all real numbers between 0 and 1; but not including either 0 or 1.

To give the set (0,1) a topology means to say which subsets of (0,1) are "open", and to do so in a way that the following axioms are met:

 The union of open sets is an open set.
 The finite intersection of open sets is an open set.
 The set (0,1) and the empty set ∅ are open sets.

Construction 

The set (0,1) and the empty set ∅ are required to be open sets, and so we define (0,1) and ∅ to be open sets in this topology. The other open sets in this topology are all of the form  where n is a positive whole number greater than or equal to two i.e. .

Properties 

 The nested interval topology is neither Hausdorff nor T1. In fact, if x is an element of (0,1), then the closure of the singleton set {x} is the half-open interval , where n is maximal such that .
 The nested interval topology is not compact. It is, however, strongly Lindelöf since there are only countably many open sets.
 The nested interval topology is hyperconnected and hence connected.
 The nested interval topology is Alexandrov.

References 

General topology